Kandahar is an upcoming American action thriller film directed by Ric Roman Waugh, written by Mitchell LaFortune, and produced by Gerard Butler, who also stars in the film alongside Ali Fazal. The film is scheduled to be released in theaters on May 26, 2023, by Open Road Films.

Plot
Tom Harris, an undercover CIA operative, is stuck deep in hostile territory in Afghanistan. When an intelligence leak exposes his identity and mission, he must fight his way out, alongside his Afghan translator, to an extraction point in Kandahar, all whilst avoiding the elite special forces unit tasked with hunting them down.

Cast
Gerard Butler as Tom Harris
Olivia-Mai Barrett as Ida Harris
Rebecca Calder as Corrine Harris (voice)
Ali Fazal
Navid Negahban
 Bahador Foladi as Farzad Asadi
 Faizan Munawar Varya as Ahmed Nasiri
Nina Toussaint-White
Travis Fimmel

Production
In June 2016, former military intelligence officer Mitchell LaFortune sold his spec script Burn Run to Thunder Road Films. He based it on his experiences working for the Defense Intelligence Agency and being deployed to Afghanistan in 2013 during the Snowden leaks. In June 2020, it was announced Gerard Butler would produce and star in the film, which had been retitled Kandahar, reteaming with Angel Has Fallen and Greenland director Ric Roman Waugh.

Ali Fazal and Navid Negahban joined the cast in December 2021. Majority of filming commenced on December 2, 2021 in Saudi Arabia. This made the film the first big-budget U.S. feature to shoot in the country's Al-Ula and Jeddah. Nina Toussaint-White and Bahador Foladi joined the cast later that same month. Filming wrapped in January 2022.

Release
In September 2022, Open Road Films acquired the film's U.S. distribution rights in an eight-figure deal. In January 2023, it was announced that the film would be released in theaters on May 26, 2023.

References

External links
 

2023 action thriller films
2020s American films
2020s chase films
2020s English-language films
Action films based on actual events
American action thriller films
American chase films
American films based on actual events
Films about the Central Intelligence Agency
Films directed by Ric Roman Waugh
Films produced by Basil Iwanyk
Films set in Afghanistan
Films shot in Saudi Arabia
Open Road Films films
Thriller films based on actual events
Thunder Road Films films
Upcoming English-language films